Diplolepis is a plant genus in the family Apocynaceae, first described as a genus in 1810. It is native to southern South America (Argentina and Chile).

Species

 Diplolepis boerhaviifolia - Chile
 Diplolepis descolei -  Argentina
 Diplolepis geminiflora -  Chile 
 Diplolepis hieronymi -  Argentina
 Diplolepis menziesii - Chile
 Diplolepis nummulariifolia - Chile

formerly included
 D. apiculata, syn of Tylophora hirsuta 
 D. longirostrum, syn of  Cynanchum longirostrum 
 D. ovata, syn of Tylophora ovata 
 D. variabilis, syn of Cynanchum atacamense 
 D. vomitoria, syn of Tylophora asthmatica

References

Apocynaceae genera
Flora of South America
Asclepiadoideae